The Greenall Whitley Gold Cup was a National Hunt Listed handicap chase in England. It was run at Haydock Park over a distance of 3 miles (4,828 metres), and it was scheduled to take place each year in February or early March.

The event was established in 1968 and was last run in February 1990.  In 1991 the distance was increased to 3 miles and 4 furlongs and although it initially kept the Greenalls name it was effectively the Grand National Trial, a race that had not been run since 1984.

Winners
 Weights given in stones and pounds.

References
Racing Post
 

National Hunt races in Great Britain
National Hunt chases
Haydock Park Racecourse
Discontinued horse races